The Jackson micropolitan area may refer to:

The Jackson micropolitan area, Ohio, United States
The Jackson micropolitan area, Wyoming–Idaho, United States

See also
Jackson metropolitan area (disambiguation)
Jackson (disambiguation)